Kwame Darko (born in 1955) is a Ghanaian politician and an economist, who served as member of parliament for Bibiani/Anhwiaso constituency in the Western Region of Ghana.

Early life and education 
Kwame Darko was born in the year 1955 in the western Region of Ghana. He attended University of Cape Coast where he obtained his Bachelor of Arts in Economics and Sociology.

Personal life 
He is a Christian.

Politics 
Kwame Darko was elected in 1992 Ghanaian parliamentary election representing the National Democratic Congress party as member of the first parliament of the fourth republic of Ghana. He succeeded A. O. F. Tawiah of the People's National Party(PNP). Unfortunately he lost the seat during the 1996 Ghanaian general election to Seidu Paakuna Adamu of the National Democratic Congress, who won the seat with 24,437 votes out of the 37,712 valid votes cast representing 52.30% over his opponents Christopher Addae a New Patriotic Party (NPP) member and Moses Jasi-Addae an Every Ghanaian Living Everywhere (EGLE) member who polled 13,275 votes representing 28.40% of the share and 0 vote respectively.

Career 
Kwame Darko a former member of parliament for Bibiani from 7 January 1993 to 7 January 1997.

References 

Ghanaian MPs 1993–1997
National Democratic Congress (Ghana) politicians
People from Western Region (Ghana)
University of Cape Coast alumni
Ghanaian Christians
Ghanaian economists
Living people
1955 births